The Steel & Sons Cup (also referred to as the Steel Cup) is an intermediate football competition in Northern Ireland run by the North East Ulster Football Association (also known as the County Antrim & District Football Association).

The competition culminates in the final which has traditionally been played on 25 December (except when this date falls on a Sunday). The 2006 final, however, broke with tradition when it was staged on the Saturday before 25 December as this was a closed date for all other football fixtures in Northern Ireland. The final returned to its original Christmas Day slot in 2007-08. The 2012–13 tournament was declared null after Glentoran II were stripped of their title having fielded an ineligible player in an earlier round. This is the first time in the tournament's history that no winner was declared.

The current holder is Bangor Football Club.

The trophy

The "Steel Cup" trophy was donated to the County Antrim FA in 1895 by Mr David Steel. Steel was principal of Steel & Sons Ltd, wholesale jewellers, silversmiths, cutlers, watch-makers and opticians, with premises on Royal Avenue, Belfast.

Since 1973 a second trophy has been awarded after the final - the Player of the Match Award. Initially sponsored by the Sunday News, the first winner was Tommy Craig of Glentoran II. Since the 1993 final the award has been sponsored by the Belfast News Letter.

Venue of final

The home for the final was rotated round the major Irish League venues in Belfast until the late 1950s when Solitude became the regular venue. Since the 1972-73 season Seaview, home of Crusaders, has hosted all the final ties, with the exception of the final and replay in 1975-76 and the replay of the 1984-85 final, which were played at Solitude.

Past finals
Key:

Performance by club

See also
Bob Radcliffe Cup
Craig Memorial Cup
Fermanagh & Western Intermediate Cup
County Antrim Shield

Sources

External links
 Steel & Sons Cup Archive at the Irish Football Club Project

Association football cup competitions in Northern Ireland
Association football in County Antrim